Languidic is a commune in the Morbihan department of Brittany in north-western France.

History
The local church was previously associated with the cult of the Welsh saint Cenydd (Kenneth).

Geography
Languidic, encompassing 10,908 hectares, is the most spread-out city in Morbihan and the third in Brittany.
The river Ével forms part of the commune's north-eastern border, then flows into the Blavet, which forms its northern and north-western borders.

Demographics
Inhabitants of Languidic are called in French Languidiciens.

Breton language
In 2008, there was 18,1% of the children attended the bilingual schools in primary education.
In 2013, there was 200 children in bilingual schools (primary education).

Twinning
Languidic is twinned with :
Great Cornard, England since 21 October 1989. 
Rimpar, Germany since July 1997.

See also
Communes of the Morbihan department
Henri Gouzien, sculptor of Languidic War Memorial

References

External links

Official site 

 Mayors of Morbihan Association 

Communes of Morbihan